Mary Star of the Sea may refer to:

 Our Lady, Star of the Sea, an ancient title for the Virgin Mary
 Mary Star of the Sea (album), by the musical group Zwan.
 Our Lady Star of the Sea Church (disambiguation), or variations

See also
 Star of the Sea (disambiguation)